Pseudochromis tigrinus the tiger dottyback, is a species of ray-finned fish from the Eastern Indian Ocean around the Andaman Islands, which is a member of the family Pseudochromidae.

References

tigrinus
Taxa named by Gerald R. Allen
Taxa named by Mark van Nydeck Erdmann
Fish described in 2012